The White Spot / Delta Road Race is an elite women's professional one-day road bicycle race held in Canada and is currently rated by the UCI as a 1.2 race.

Past winners

References 

Cycle races in Canada
Women's road bicycle races
Women's sports in Canada